Best Direct is a home shopping television channel, broadcast in the United Kingdom on the Sky Digital platform. Additionally the channel is available free-to-air on the Eutelsat 28A satellite.

The Best Direct channel is owned and operated by Best Direct International Ltd. Best Direct International was formed in 1992; however, the roots of the company can be traced back to the late 1940s when William Levene (the father of the company's current chairman, Michael Levene) exhibited household products he had obtained worldwide at county shows, fairs and exhibitions.

An additional timeshift service (Best Direct +) was available solely on Sky Digital. 'Best Direct +' was renamed 'Blueberry TV' on the Sky EPG in November 2009.

From 16 September 2008, Best Direct was also broadcast on the Freesat platform (channel 813), but was removed on 21 April 2009 (Later relaunched in 2016 but re-removed in 2017-2018) and on Virgin Media from 2007 replacing Thane Direct, however it was removed on 17 January 2014. In Germany, the TV broadcaster 9Live broadcast advertising from Best Direct.

External links
 Best Direct homepage

Shopping networks in the United Kingdom